The 2004 NCAA men's volleyball tournament was the 35th annual tournament to determine the national champion of NCAA men's collegiate indoor volleyball. The single elimination tournament was played at the Stan Sheriff Center in Honolulu, Hawaiʻi during May 2004.

BYU defeated Long Beach State in the final match, 3–2 (15–30, 30–18, 20–30, 32–30, 19–17), to win their third national title. The Cougars (29–4) were coached by Tom Peterson.

BYU's Carlos Moreno was named the tournament's Most Outstanding Player. Moreno, along with six other players, also comprised the All Tournament Team.

Qualification
Until the creation of the NCAA Men's Division III Volleyball Championship in 2012, there was only a single national championship for men's volleyball. As such, all NCAA men's volleyball programs, whether from Division I, Division II, or Division III, were eligible. A total of 4 teams were invited to contest this championship.

Tournament bracket 
Site: Stan Sheriff Center, Honolulu, Hawaiʻi

All tournament team 
Carlos Moreno, BYU (Most outstanding player)
Fernando Pessoa, BYU
Scott Touzinsky, Long Beach State
Duncan Budinger, Long Beach State
Tyler Hildebrand, Long Beach State
Keith Kowal, Penn State
Jeff Soler, Lewis

See also 
 NCAA Men's National Collegiate Volleyball Championship
 NCAA Women's Volleyball Championships (Division I, Division II, Division III)

References

2004
NCAA Men's Volleyball Championship
NCAA Men's Volleyball Championship
2004 in sports in Hawaii
Volleyball in Hawaii